The 1916 Lafayette football team was an American football team that represented Lafayette College as an independent during the 1916 college football season. In its third and final season under head coach Wilmer G. Crowell, the team compiled a 2–6–1 record. Paul Taylor was the team captain.  The team played its home games at March Field in Easton, Pennsylvania.

Schedule

References

Lafayette
Lafayette Leopards football seasons
Lafayette football